The Da Yu ding is an ancient Chinese bronze circular ding vessel from the Western Zhou dynasty (1046–771 BC). Excavated in Li Village, Jingdang Township, Qishan County, Shaanxi, it is on display in the National Museum of China.

The Da Yu ding, the Da Ke ding in the Shanghai Museum, and the Mao Gong ding in the National Palace Museum in Taipei are often mentioned together as a few of the most important pieces of ancient Chinese bronze vessels, and sometimes collectively called "Three Treasures of China" (Chinese: "（青铜器）海内三宝").

Description
The tripod is round, with three legs, a common shape during the Western Zhou dynasty. Its mouth is engraved with Taotie patterns and its four legs are engraved with animal face patterns. The king attributed to is King Kang of Zhou (1020–996 BC), and the date is attributed to the 23rd Year of the king, the Western Zhou dynasty (1046–771 BC)

Inscription

The tripod's inside features 19 lines collectively containing 291 Chinese characters. Most is the King's Speech. The first speech is a historical overview in which he provides a moral rationale for the fall of the Shang dynasty (c. 1600–1046 BC) and the rise of the Western Zhou. Here, the King said that drinking wine in excess has made the Shang dynasty lose the Mandate of Heaven, grace, and the army, while the Kings of Zhou do not drink excessively even ceremonially. The King further commands Yu to support the King and to work official service throughout days. The second speech is a short charge to Yu to emulate his late grandfather, Nang Gong. The third speech is the appointment of the king's minister with army power and a detailed inventory given by the King. The last section of the inscription is Yu himself recording that he made this tripod for his deceased grandfather Nang Gong in response to the king's kindness. It was the king's 23rd year. The inclusion of 1726 slaves in the listed inventory is an important historical resource for studying slavery.

History

In the Daoguang era (1821–1851) of the Qing dynasty (1644–1911), this tripod was unearthed in Li village,  Jingdang Township, Qishan County, Shaanxi. Song Jinjian (1821–1863), a local rich man, acquired it. Next, the governor Zhou Gengsheng expropriated it. After he died, Song Jinjian recovered the tripod.

Before winter 1873, Yuan Baoheng (1826–1878), a follower of Zuo Zongtang bought it for 700 taels of silver. Yuan may have sent the tripod he bought to Zuo. In 1875, Zuo Zongtang presented the tripod he treasured as a gift to Pan Zuyin (1830–1890) in Beijing.
Pan Zuyin was a famous collector with rich knowledge in Chinese characters. In 1890, Pan acquired the Da Ke ding, the second largest bronzeware of the Western Zhou dynasty after the Da Yu ding. His younger brother Pan Zunian (1870–1925) inherited the family property. In about 1896, the Pan family moved to Suzhou from Beijing with their collection, including the two tripods.

In 1937, the Second Sino-Japanese War broke out. Fearing looting or destruction, the Pan family packed the two tripods in a wood box and buried it.

In 1951, Pan Dayu (1906–2007) donated the two tripods to the Shanghai Museum. There, they would be displayed together until 1959, when the Da Yu ding was transferred to the National Museum of China in Beijing. In March 2004, to celebrate Pan Dayu's 100 birthday, the Da Yu ding was transferred to the Shanghai Museum for a limited time display, the first time the tripods were together in nearly 50 years.

See also
 List of Chinese cultural relics forbidden to be exhibited abroad

Notes

References
 
 
Shanghai Museum, YU DING KE DING. ('Yu' Vessels and 'Ke' Vessels) (Chinese Text). Shanghai, 1959.
Da yu Ding Chinese Rubbing Collection Harvard University, USA
Robert Eno, Inscriptional Records of the Western Zou, 2012 23-24p, Indiana University SITE, Bloomington, USA
 Jeffrey R. Thersen, CHINESE EUPHONICS :PHONETIC PATTERNS, PHONORHETORIC AND LITERARY ARTISTRY IN EARLY CHINESE NARRATIVE TEXTS, Ph. D Dissertation in Department of East Asian Department, University of Chicago, 2015, Dec, Chicago, Illinois, USA

External links

History of Baoji
Collection of the National Museum of China
Zhou dynasty bronzeware
1849 archaeological discoveries
Dings